El Salvador is scheduled to compete at the 2023 Pan American Games in Santiago, Chile from October 20 to November 5, 2023. This will be El Salvador's 19th appearance at the Pan American Games, having competed at every edition of the games.

Competitors
The following is the list of number of competitors (per gender) participating at the games per sport/discipline.

Archery

El Salvador qualified four archers during the 2022 Pan American Archery Championships.

Men

Women

Mixed

Sailing

El Salvador has qualified 1 boat for a total of 1 sailor.

Men

Shooting

El Salvador qualified a total of four shooters in the 2022 Americas Shooting Championships.

Men
Pistol and rifle

Women
Pistol and rifle

See also
El Salvador at the 2024 Summer Olympics

References

Nations at the 2023 Pan American Games
2023